Sarojini Agarwal is a member of the Uttar Pradesh Legislative Council. In the elections on 23 March, BJP won 11 out of 13 seats and the remaining two were won by Samajwadi Party and Bahujan Samaj Party each.

She had earlier in 2017 vacated her seat for Yogi Adityanath to become an MLC after he was chosen as the Chief Minister of Uttar Pradesh.

References

Living people
Samajwadi Party politicians from Uttar Pradesh
Year of birth missing (living people)